The coat of arms of Mexico (literally "national shield of Mexico") is a national symbol of Mexico and depicts a Mexican (golden) eagle perched on a prickly pear cactus devouring a rattlesnake. The design is rooted in the legend that the Aztec people would know where to build their city once they saw an eagle eating a snake on top of a lake. The image has been an important symbol of Mexican politics and culture for centuries. To the people of Tenochtitlan, this symbol had strong religious connotations, and to the Europeans, it came to symbolize the triumph of good over evil (with the snake sometimes representative of the serpent in the Garden of Eden).

The Mexican law on the National Arms, Flag, and Anthem regulates the name, the design and use of the arms. There they are officially called "coat of arms" (literally "shield"), even if there is no heraldic shield and therefore, according to the rules of heraldry, it is not a traditional "coat of arms" and more precisely a "national emblem" instead (National Emblem of Mexico). It is in the centre of the flag of Mexico, is engraved on the obverse of Mexican peso coins, and is the basis of the Seal of the United Mexican States, the seal used on any official documents issued by the federal, state or municipal governmental authorities. The seal differs from the arms by the addition of the words  ("United Mexican States", the full official name of the country) in a semicircle around the upper half.

Legend of Tenochtitlan

The coat of arms recalls the founding of Mexico City, then Tenochtitlan. The legend of Tenochtitlan, as shown in the original Aztec codices, paintings, and post-Cortesian codices, does not include a snake. While the Codex Fejérváry-Mayer depicts an eagle attacking a snake, other Mexica illustrations, such as the Codex Mendoza, show only an eagle; in the text of the Ramírez Codex, however, Huitzilopochtli asked the Tenochtitlan people to look for an eagle devouring a snake, perched on a prickly pear cactus. In the text by Chimalpahin Cuauhtlehuanitzin, the eagle is devouring something, but it is not mentioned what it is. Other versions (such as the backside of the Teocalli of the Sacred War) show the eagle clutching the Aztec symbol of war, the  glyph, or "burning water".

Moreover, the original meanings of the symbols were different in numerous ways. The eagle was a representation of the sun god Huitzilopochtli, who was very important, as the Mexicas referred to themselves as the "People of the Sun". The cactus (Opuntia ficus-indica), full of its fruits, called  in Nahuatl, represents the island of Tenochtitlan. To the Mexicas, the snake represented wisdom, and it had strong connotations with the god Quetzalcoatl. The story of the snake was derived from an incorrect translation of the Crónica Mexicáyotl by Fernando Alvarado Tezozómoc. In the story, the Nahuatl text  "the snake hisses" was mistranslated as "the snake is torn". Based on this, Father Diego Durán reinterpreted the legend so that the eagle represents all that is good and right, while the snake represents evil and sin. Despite its inaccuracy, the new legend was adopted because it conformed with European heraldic tradition. To the Europeans, it would represent the struggle between good and evil. Although this interpretation does not conform to pre-Columbian traditions, it was an element that could be used by the first missionaries for the purposes of evangelism and the conversion of the native peoples.

Symbolism

Creatures

In 1960, the Mexican ornithologist Rafael Martín del Campo identified the eagle in the pre-Hispanic codex as the crested caracara or "quebrantahuesos" (bonebreaker), a species common in Mexico (although the name "eagle" is taxonomically incorrect, as the caracara is in the falcon family). The golden eagle is considered the official bird of Mexico. When Father Durán introduced the snake, it was originally an aquatic serpent. But in 1917, the serpent was changed to be a rattlesnake, because it was more common than the aquatic varieties in pre-Hispanic illustrations. As a result of this, the design and color of the snake on the modern coat of arms do not correspond with those of any species of snake, and were inspired by the representations of Quetzalcoatl, a rattlesnake with quetzal feathers.

Elements
 The eagle, in a combative stance
 The snake, held by a talon and the beak of the eagle
 The nopal on which the eagle stands; The nopal bears some of its fruits (tunas)
 The pedestal, on which the nopal grows, immersed in the Aztec symbol for water
 Oak and laurel leaves encircling the eagle cluster; tied together with a ribbon with the Mexican flag's colors

Pictography
 The emblem can be interpreted on at least two levels of abstraction. First, the pictographic/logographic depiction of the name of the Aztec's capital city, Tenochtitlan, as tenoch refers to the cactus fruit while -ti-tlan is a ligatured locative suffix meaning "below/among/at the base of." On another level, it represents one of the most important cosmological beliefs of the Aztec culture.
 The emblem shows an eagle devouring a serpent, which actually is in conflict with Mesoamerican belief. The eagle is a symbol of the sun and a representation of the victorious god Huitzilopochtli, in which form, according to legend, bowed to the arriving Aztecs. The snake is a symbol of the earth and, in certain pre-Hispanic traditions, a representation of Quetzalcoatl; more specifically, in Aztec (Mexica) tradition, the snake is the representation of Coatlicue, the personification of earth and mother of Huitzilopochtli. In some codices, the eagle holds the glyph for war to represent the victorious Huitzilopochtli. This glyph, the Atl tlachinolli, which means "water and flame", has a certain resemblance with a snake, and may plausibly be the origin of this confusion.
 With the element, the attributed element of the moon, it recalls the mythology of the god and hero of the Aztecs.
 The fruit of the nopal cactus, called tuna, represents the heart of Copil, the nephew of the god Huitzilopochtli. The god ordered the people to "build the city in the place of Copil's heart" (Ramírez Codex), where the cactus grew on his land. It also alludes to the human sacrifice customs of the Aztecs.

Derivatives
The seal of New Mexico includes the eagle, snake, and cactus of the Mexican seal, sheltered or dominated by a larger bald eagle, representing New Mexico's history as part of Mexico and its later status as part of the United States. After the territory of New Mexico was admitted to the Union in 1912, a commission examining the new state's symbols recommended that both the "American" and "Mexican" eagles be North American golden eagles, but instead it uses an American bald eagle for the United States and a harpy eagle for Mexico.

Chronology

Regional government

Current entities

See also

 Flag of Mexico
 List of Mexican flags
 National symbols of Mexico
 Seal of New Mexico

References

External links

Virtual Museum of Mexican Birds (archived 17 January 2005)
El escudo nacional mexicano (archived 28 October 2005)

Mexico
National symbols of Mexico
Mexican heraldry
Mexico
Mexico
Mexico
Mexico
Mexico